Enzo Joaquín Sosa Romañuk (born 10 January 2002) is a Uruguayan professional footballer who plays as a defender for  club Bologna.

Club career
Sosa is a youth academy graduate of Nacional. He made his professional debut for the club on 7 April 2021, in second leg of 2020 Championship playoff final against Rentistas. Four days later, on 11 April, he joined Rentistas on a season long loan deal.

Sosa joined Liverpool Montevideo on a season long loan deal in February 2022.

On 17 August 2022, Sosa signed with Bologna in Italy.

International career
Sosa is a former Uruguayan youth international. He was included in the national team for the 2017 South American U-15 Championship and 2019 South American U-17 Championship.

Career statistics

Honours
Nacional
Uruguayan Primera División: 2020

References

External links
 

2002 births
Living people
People from Fray Bentos
Association football defenders
Uruguayan footballers
Uruguay youth international footballers
Uruguayan Primera División players
Club Nacional de Football players
C.A. Rentistas players
Liverpool F.C. (Montevideo) players
Bologna F.C. 1909 players
Uruguayan expatriate footballers
Expatriate footballers in Italy
Uruguayan expatriate sportspeople in Italy